Paranoid was a German EBM group, formed in 1987 in Aachen, North Rhine-Westphalia, Germany, by Stephan Tesch and Michael Formberg. They disbanded in 1993.

Discography

Albums
 1991 Strain (Animalized: LP / CD / Cass)
 1992 Sweat Blood & Tears (Machinery Records: CD)
 2011 I Still Dominate You (Infacted Recordings: CD)  
2016 Never too late (Infacted Recordings: CD)

Singles
 1991 I Dominate You (Animalized: 12")
 1991 Vicious Circle (Animalized: CD / 12")
 1992 Desire (Animalized: CD / 12")
 1992 Love And Hate (Machinery Records: CD / 12")

References

External links
 Paranoid at Discogs
 Paranoid (Tribute to) at MySpace
 Paranoid at Rate Your Music
 Paranoid at MusicBrainz

Electronic body music groups
German electronic music groups
Musical groups established in 1987
Musical groups disestablished in 1999